Antonio Richarte (1690–1764) was a Spanish painter.

He was born at Yecla. He was very popular at Valencia, where he was much employed in painting processional banners for the guilds of that city.

References

1690 births
1764 deaths
18th-century Spanish painters
18th-century Spanish male artists
Spanish male painters
Spanish Baroque painters